Dinosaur colour is one of the unknowns in the field of paleontology as skin pigmentation is nearly always lost during the fossilization process. However, recent studies of feathered dinosaurs have shown that we might be able to infer the colour of some species through the use of melanosomes, the color-determining pigments within the feathers.

Feathered dinosaurs

Anchiornis

In 2010, paleontologists studied a well-preserved skeleton of Anchiornis, an averaptoran from the Tiaojishan Formation in China, and found melanosomes within its fossilised feathers. As different shaped melanosomes determine different colors, analysis of the melanosomes allowed the paleontologists to infer that Anchiornis had black, white and grey feathers all over its body and a crest of dark red or ochre feathers on its head.

Another specimen was reported to possess melanosomes which induced grey and black coloration, but none that suggested red or brown coloration.

Sinosauropteryx

In 2010 Dr. Mike Benton from the University of Bristol analyzed the remains of Sinosauropteryx, Confuciusornis, Caudipteryx, and Sinornithosaurus from the Yixian and also discovered melanosomes. It was determined that Sinosauropteryx had orange feathers and that its tail was striped. Given the feathers were brightly colored and ill-suited for flight it is hypothesised that this species used its feathers for display. A 2017 study also reported that the body coloration of Sinosauropteryx extended to the face, creating a raccoon-like "mask" around the eyes.

Beipiaosaurus

Beipiaosaurus had a dense covering of downy-like fibers along with a secondary coat of longer, simpler feathers. In a study of colour and shape of fossilised melanosomes in numerous extant and fossil specimens, Li et al. 2014 found that the preserved feathers in the head and neck area of the Beipiaosaurus specimen implied brownish and dark brownish coloration.

Archaeopteryx

In 2012, graduate student Ryan Carney and colleagues produced the first colour study on an Archaeopteryx specimen; fossilised melanosomes suggested a primarily black coloration in the feathers of the specimen. The feather studied was likely a covert, which would have partly covered the primary feathers on the wings. Carney pointed out that this is consistent with the flight feathers of modern birds, in which black melanosomes have structural properties that strengthen feathers for flight.

In 2013, a study published in the Journal of Analytical Atomic Spectrometry by Phillip Manning and colleagues reported new analyses on the feather revealing that Archaeopteryx may have had light and dark colored plumage, with only the tips of the feathers being primarily black instead of the entire feather. Whether or not this coloration was primarily for display or flight is as yet unknown.

A follow-up study by Carney and colleagues in 2020 suggested that the feather was matte black, not iridescent, with 90% probability, owing to the less elongated shape of the melanosomes. However, they noted that some of the melanosomes preserved three-dimensionally in the specimen were distorted to give the impression of iridescent melanosomes. Unlike Manning and colleagues, they reconstructed the feather as being completely darker at the tip.

Microraptor

According to a 2012 study by Quanguo Li and team of specimen BMNHC PH881 the coloration of the feathers of a typical Microraptor was iridescent black. The melanosomes were narrow and arranged in stacked layers, reminiscent of the blackbird. It is believed that Microraptor were nocturnal due to size of the scleral ring in its eye. However, now that its feathers have been determined to be iridescent its nocturnal nature has been cast into doubt, since no known modern birds with iridescent plumage are nocturnal.

Inkayacu

The melanosomes within the feathers of the Eocene penguin Inkayacu are long and narrow, similar to most other birds. Their shape suggests that Inkayacu had grey and reddish-brown feathering across its body. Most modern penguins have melanosomes that are of similar length to those of Inkayacu, but are much wider. There are also a greater number of them within living penguins' cells. The shape of these melanosomes gives them a dark brown or black color, and is the reason why modern penguins are mostly black and white. Despite not having the distinctive melanosomes of modern penguins, the feathers of Inkayacu were similar in many other ways. For instance, the feathers that made up the body contour of the species have large shafts, and the primaries along the edge of the wings are short and undifferentiated.

Cruralispennia

Structures believed to be fossilised melanosomes were found in five feather samples from the only known specimen of this enantiornithean bird using scanning electron microscopy. Due to their rod-like shape, they were identified as eumelanosomes, which correspond to dark shades. Although specific colors were not stated in the analysis, other studies have shown that coloration in extant birds correlates to the length and aspect ratio (length to width ratio) of their eumelanosomes. A sample taken from the crural feathers had eumelanosomes with the shortest aspect ratio, which may have corresponded to dark brown coloration. The highest aspect ratio eumelanosomes were found in a sample from the head feathers. High aspect ratios have been known to correlate with glossy or iridescent colors, although without knowing the structure of a feather's keratin layer (which does not fossilise well), no hue can be assigned for certain. The wing and tail samples also had high aspect ratios, while the tail's eumelanosomes were the largest sampled.

Caihong

The fossilised feathers of Caihong possessed nanostructures which were analyzed and interpreted as melanosomes. They showed similarity to organelles that produce a black iridescent colour in extant birds. Other feathers found on the head, chest, and the base of the tail preserve flattened sheets of platelet-like melanosomes very similar in shape to those which create brightly colored iridescent hues in the feathers of modern hummingbirds. However, these structures are seemingly solid and lack air bubbles, and thus are internally more akin to the melanosomes in trumpeters than hummingbirds. Caihong represents the oldest known evidence of platelet-like melanosomes.

Non-feathered dinosaurs

Psittacosaurus

In 2016, examination of melanosomes preserved in the integument of a specimen of Psittacosaurus sp. indicated that the animal was counter-shaded, with stripes and spots on the limbs for disruptive coloration. This is similar to that of many modern species of forest-dwelling deer and antelope and may be due to a preference for a densely forested habitat with low light. The specimen also had dense clusters of pigment on its shoulders, face (possibly for display), and cloaca (which may have had an antimicrobial function), as well as large patagia on its hind legs that connected to the base of the tail. Its large eyes indicate that it had good vision, and may be an indication of nocturnal habits.

Borealopelta

In a 2017 study examination of melanosomes preserved in a specimen of Borealopelta indicated that the nodosaurid had a reddish-brown coloration in life, with a counter-shaded pattern which it was speculated was used for camouflage. The discovery that Borealopelta possessed camouflage coloration may indicate that it was under threat of predation, despite its large size, and that the armor on its back was primarily used for defensive rather than display purposes.

References

External links
 Orange stripey dinosaurs? Fossil feathers reveal their secret colors, The Guardian, February 28, 2010
 What colour were dinosaurs?, The Guardian, February 7, 2009
 

Animal morphology
Dinosaur paleobiology